During 313 BC, in the Mauryan period Kautilya created the treatise called Kautilya Arthashastra. He laid down the qualifications for appointments of civil servants.

During 1000–1600 AD, in the medieval period, Akbar the Great nurtured the civil service. It was during his period there was initiation of land reforms and established the land revenue system which later formed to become the constituent of the Indian taxation system.

Notes 

Civil service in India
Maurya Empire
Akbar